The kings of Leinster, ruled from the establishment of Leinster during the Irish Iron Age, until the 17th century Early Modern Ireland. According to Gaelic traditional history, laid out in works such as the Book of Invasions, Leinster originates from the division of Ireland between the Irish Gaels, descendants of Milesius: Leinster was one of the territories held by the offspring of Heremon. In the 7th century BC, the branch of the Heremonians who would establish Leinster, starting with Úgaine Mór were also High Kings of Ireland and Kings of Tara. Their ascent to hegemony in Ireland was associated with the decline in influence of their Ulster-based Heremonian kinsmen from the Érainn.

Aside from Úgaine Mór, other prominent Kings of Leinster from this period who were also High Kings of Ireland were Labraid Loingsech and Cathair Mór. A mythology developed that Labraid Loingsech had horses ears: he spent some time exiled in Transalpine Gaul (dated roughly to the period of the Roman-Gallic Wars) where his grandmother was from and returned to Ireland with Gaullish mercenaries. He established a base in the area, which was renamed from "Gailian" to Leinster, in reference to the pointed-spears held by the Gaullish Gaesatae mercenaries who provided the backbone of Labraid Loingsech's powerbase and brought him to the High Kingship. Cathair Mór, who was also a High King of Ireland, is perhaps the most important figure genealogically in Leinster as all of the subsequent kinship groups which ruled Gaelic Leinster claimed descent and legitimacy to rule from one of his ten sons who had offspring.

By the time of Early Christian Ireland, the Laighín had lost their grip on Irish hegemony with the rise of the descendants of Conn of the Hundred Battles (the Connachta and the Uí Néill). The latter pushed down into Leinster and created the Kingdom of Meath based at Uisnech, under the Southern Uí Néill from territories belonging to the Kingdom of Leinster and to the west Osraige was taken from the Laighín by the Corcu Loígde of Munster.

During the 5th to the early 8th centuries, the Kingship of Leinster was contested by various different branches of the Laighín, including the Uí Cheinnselaig (ancestors of the Mac Murchada and Caomhánach), the Uí Dúnlainge (ancestors of the O'Byrnes and the O'Tooles),  the Uí Bairrche (ancestors of the Uí Treasaig (Tracey) and Mac Gormáin), the Uí Máil (ancestors of the Ó Conchobhair Uí Failghe) and others.

From the 8th until the 11th century, the kingship of Leinster rotated in a remarkable stable arrangement between three branches of the North Leinster Uí Dúnlainge kinship, namelt the Uí Fáeláin (ancestors of the O'Byrnes), the Uí Muiredaig (ancestors of the O'Tooles) and the Uí Dúnchada (whose descendants became the MacGillaMoCholmóc and later the FitzDermots). In the 9th century, the Laighín also regained control of Osraige but it remained a largely independent realm under the Mac Giolla Phádrag, from the semi-autonomous Uí Failghe kinship group.

The Uí Cheinnselaig in South Leinster took back control of the kingship of Leinster in the 11th century, with Diarmait mac Máel na mBó, who became the first Leinsterman to be High King of Ireland in over a thousand years and claimed to the most senior line of the Laighín. An enemy of the Vikings of Dublin, he gave refuge to the sons of Harold Godwinson after the Normans conquered England. It is from this line that the Mac Murchada family originate and later Diarmait Mac Murchada would be implicated in the 12th century Norman invasion of Ireland after he tried to win back his Leinster throne. The reigning dynasty adopted the surname Caomhánach (Kavanagh) and continued to rule a rump Kingdom of Leinster until the early 17th century, with the last recorded King of Leinster being Domhnall Spáinneach Mac Murchadha Caomhánach. Throughout the centuries after the Norman invasion, several Kings and also leaders from dynasties who had previously held the Kingship of Leinster, continued to resist the invasion and hounded the English Pale periodically from the Wicklow Mountains: including the leaders of the O'Toole and O'Byrne clans (notable examples include Art Óg Mac Murchadha Caomhánach and Fiach McHugh O'Byrne) until the 17th century.

Legendary Kings
Mesgegra

Kings of Leinster

Laigin, classical antiquity

|-
| Úgaine Mór634–594 BC ||  || Son of Eochu Buadach||unknown || 594 BCE
|-
| Lóegaire Lorc594–592 BC ||  || Son of Úgaine Mór||unknown || 592 BCE
|-
| Ailill Áine592–592 BC ||  || Son of Lóegaire Lorc||unknown || 592 BCE
|-
| Cobthach Cóel Breg592–542 BC ||  || Son of Úgaine Mór||unknown || 542 BCE
|-
| Labraid Loingsech542–523 BC ||  || Son of Ailill Áine mac Lóegaire Lorc||unknown || 523 BCE
|-
| Cathair Mór 119–122 AD ||  || Son of Fedlimid Fir Urglais mac Cormaic Gealtach||11 children || 122 AD
|-
|}

Uí Cheinnselaig, 5th century

|-
| Fiacha Baicheda mac Cathair Mór – ||  || Son of Cathair Mór ||unknown || unknown
|-
| Bressal Bélach mac Fiacha Baicheda –436 ||  || Son of Fiacha Baicheda mac Cathair Mór ||unknown || 436
|-
| Énnae Cennsalach mac Labhradh – ||  || Son of Labhradh mac Bressal Bélach ||unknown || unknown
|-
|}

Uí Bairrche, 5th century

|-
| Muiredach Mo Sníthech mac Dáire Barrach –(claimant) ||  || Son of Dáire Barrach mac Cathair Mór ||unknown || unknown
|-
| Móenach mac Muiredach Mo Sníthech –(claimant) ||  || Son of Muiredach Mo Sníthech mac Dáire Barrach ||unknown || unknown
|-
|}

Uí Enechglaiss, –446

|-
| Mac Cairthinn mac Coelboth –446 || unknown || Son of Cóelbad ||unknown || 446
|-
|}

Uí Cheinnselaig, 446–483

|-
| Crimthann mac Énnai 446–483 ||  || Son of Énnae Cennsalach ||unknown || 483
|-
|}

Uí Garrchon, 483–495

|-
| Fincath mac Garrchu 483–485 || unknown || Son of Garrchú mac Fothaid ||unknown || 485
|-
| Fráech mac Finchada 485–495 || unknown || Son of Fincath mac Garrchu ||unknown || 495
|-
|}

Uí Dúnlainge, 495–592

|-
| Ailill mac Dúnlainge 495–527 ||  || Son of Dúnlaing mac Énda Niada ||unknown || 527
|-
| Cormac mac Ailillo527–535 ||  || Son of Ailill mac Dúnlainge ||unknown || 535
|-
| Coirpre mac Cormaic535–546 ||  || Son of Cormac mac Ailillo ||unknown || 546
|-
| Colmán Már mac Coirpre546–576 ||  || Son of Coirpre mac Cormaic ||unknown || 576
|-
| Áed Dub mac Colmáin576–592 ||  || Son of Colmán Már mac Coirpre ||unknown || 639
|-
|}

Uí Máil, 592–595

|-
| Áed Dibchine 592–595 ||  || Son of Seanach Diodhach mac Carthann Muadh ||unknown || 595
|-
|}

Uí Cheinnselaig, 595–624

|-
| Brandub mac Echach 595–605 ||  || Son of Echu mac Muiredaig ||unknown || 605
|-
| Rónán mac Colmáin 605–624 ||  || Son of Colmán mac Cormaic ||unknown || 624
|-
|}

Uí Máil, 624–633

|-
| Crimthann mac Áedo 624–633 ||  || Son of Áed Dibchine ||unknown || 633
|-
|}

Uí Dúnlainge, 633–666

|-
| Fáelán mac Colmáin 633–656656–666 ||  || Son of Colmán Már mac Coirpri ||unknown || 666
|-
|}

Uí Cheinnselaig, 656

|-
| Crundmáel Erbuilc 656 ||  || Son of Rónán mac Colmáin ||unknown || 656
|-
|}

Uí Máil, 666–680

|-
| Fiannamail mac Máele Tuile 666–680 ||  || Son of Máele Tuile mac Rónán Crach ||unknown || 680
|-
|}

Uí Dúnlainge, 680–693

|-
| Bran Mut mac Conaill 680–693 ||  || Son of Conall mac Fáelán ||unknown || 693
|-
|}

Uí Máil, 693–715

|-
| Cellach Cualann 693–715 ||  || Son of Gertighe mac Diocolla Dana ||unknown || 715
|-
|}

Uí Dúnlainge, 715–728

|-
| Murchad mac Brain Mut 715–727 ||  || Son of Bran Mut mac Conaill ||unknown || 727
|-
| Dúnchad mac Murchada 727–728 ||  || Son of Murchad mac Brain Mut ||unknown || 728
|-
|}

Uí Fáeláin (Uí Dúnlainge), 728–738

|-
| Fáelán mac Murchada 728–738 ||  || Son of Murchad mac Brain Mut ||unknown || 738
|-
|}

Uí Dúnlainge, 738

|-
| Bran Becc mac Murchada 738 ||  || Son of Murchad mac Brain Mut ||unknown || 738
|-
|}

Uí Cheinnselaig, 738

|-
| Áed mac Colggen 738 ||  || Son of Colcú mac Bressail ||unknown || 738
|-
|}

Uí Muiredaig (Uí Dúnlainge), 738–760

|-
| Muiredach mac Murchada 738–760 ||  || Son of Murchad mac Brain Mut ||unknown || 760
|-
|}

Uí Dúnchada (Uí Dúnlainge), 760–776

|-
| Cellach mac Dúnchada 760–776 || unknown || Son of Dúnchad mac Murchada ||unknown || 776
|-
|}

Uí Fáeláin (Uí Dúnlainge), 776–785

|-
| Ruaidrí mac Fáeláin 776–785 ||  || Son of Fáelán mac Murchada ||unknown || 785
|-
|}

Uí Muiredaig (Uí Dúnlainge), 785–795

|-
| Bran Ardchenn 785–795 ||  || Son of Muiredach mac Murchada ||unknown || 795
|-
|}

Uí Dúnchada (Uí Dúnlainge), 795–808

|-
| Fínsnechta Cethardec 795–808 || unknown || Son of Cellach mac Dúnchada ||unknown || 808
|-
|}

Uí Muiredaig (Uí Dúnlainge), 808–818

|-
| Muiredach mac Brain 808–818 ||  || Son of Bran Ardchenn ||unknown || 818
|-
|}

Uí Fáeláin (Uí Dúnlainge), 818–829

|-
| Muiredach mac Ruadrach 818–829 ||  || Son of Ruaidrí mac Fáeláin ||unknown || 829
|-
|}

Uí Muiredaig (Uí Dúnlainge), 829–834

|-
| Cellach mac Brain 829–834 ||  || Son of Bran Ardchenn ||unknown || 834
|-
|}

Uí Dúnchada (Uí Dúnlainge), 834–838

|-
| Bran mac Fáeláin 834–838 || unknown || Son of Fáelán mac Cellaig ||unknown || 838
|-
|}

Uí Muiredaig (Uí Dúnlainge), 838–854

|-
| Lorcán mac Cellaig838–851 ||  || Son of Cellach mac Brain ||unknown || unknown
|-
| Túathal mac Máele-Brigte 851–854 ||  || Son of Muiredach mac Brain ||unknown || 854
|-
|}

Uí Dúnchada (Uí Dúnlainge), 854–862

|-
| Ruarc mac Brain 854–862 || unknown || Son of Bran mac Fáeláin ||unknown || 862
|-
|}

Uí Fáeláin (Uí Dúnlainge), 862–863

|-
| Muirecán mac Diarmata 862–863 ||  || Son of Diarmata mac Ruadrach ||unknown || 863
|-
|}

Uí Muiredaig (Uí Dúnlainge), 863–871

|-
| Dúnlaing mac Muiredaig863–869 ||  || Son of Muiredach mac Brain ||unknown || 869
|-
| Ailill mac Dúnlainge 869–871 ||  || Son of Dúnlaing mac Muiredaig ||unknown || 871
|-
|}

Uí Fáeláin (Uí Dúnlainge), 871–884

|-
| Domnall mac Muirecáin 871–884 ||  || Son of Muirecán mac Diarmata ||unknown || 884
|-
|}

Uí Dúnchada (Uí Dúnlainge), 884–885

|-
| Muiredach mac Brain 884–885 || unknown || Son of Bran mac Fáeláin ||unknown || 885
|-
|}

Uí Fáeláin (Uí Dúnlainge), 885–909

|-
| Cerball mac Muirecáin 885–909 ||  || Son of Muirecán mac Diarmata ||unknown || 909
|-
|}

Uí Muiredaig (Uí Dúnlainge), 909–917

|-
| Augaire mac Aililla 909–917 ||  || Son of Ailill mac Dúnlainge ||unknown || 917
|-
|}

Uí Dúnchada (Uí Dúnlainge), 917–943

|-
| Faelan mac Muiredach 917–942 || unknown || Son of Muiredach mac Brain ||unknown || 942
|-
| Lorcán mac Fáelán 942–943 || unknown || Son of Faelan mac Muiredach ||unknown || 943
|-
|}

Uí Fáeláin (Uí Dúnlainge), 943–947

|-
| Bran Fionn mac Máel Mórda 943–947 ||  || Son of Máel Mórda mac Murchada ||unknown || 947
|-
|}

Uí Muiredaig (Uí Dúnlainge), 947–958

|-
| Túathal mac Úgaire 947–958 ||  || Son of Augaire mac Aililla ||unknown || 958
|-
|}

Uí Dúnchada (Uí Dúnlainge), 958–966

|-
| Cellach mac Faelan 958–966 || unknown || Son of Faelan mac Muiredach ||unknown || 966
|-
|}

Uí Fáeláin (Uí Dúnlainge), 966–972

|-
| Murchad mac Brain Fionn 966–972 ||  || Son of Bran Fionn mac Máel Mórda ||unknown || 972
|-
|}

Uí Muiredaig (Uí Dúnlainge), 972–978

|-
| Úgaire mac Túathail 972–978 ||  || Son of Túathal mac Úgaire ||unknown || 978
|-
|}

Uí Dúnchada (Uí Dúnlainge), 978–1003

|-
| Domnall Claen 978–984 || unknown || Son of Lorcán mac Fáelán ||unknown || 984
|-
| Donnchad mac Domnall Claen 984–1003 || unknown || Son of Domnall Claen ||unknown || unknown 
|-
|}

Uí Fáeláin (Uí Dúnlainge), 1003–1014

|-
| Máel Mórda mac Murchada 1003–1014 ||  || Son of Murchad mac Brain Fionn ||unknown || 1014
|-
|}

Uí Muiredaig (Uí Dúnlainge), 1014–1016

|-
| Dúnlaing mac Tuathal 1014 ||  || Son of Túathal mac Úgaire ||unknown || 1014
|-
| Donncuan mac Dúnlainge 1014–1016 ||  || Son of Dúnlaing mac Tuathal ||unknown || 1016
|-
|}

Uí Fáeláin (Uí Dúnlainge), 1016–1018

|-
| Bran mac Máel Mórda 1016–1018 ||  || Son of Máel Mórda mac Murchada ||unknown || 1052
|-
|}

Uí Muiredaig (Uí Dúnlainge), 1018–1033

|-
| Augaire mac Dúnlainge 1018–1024 ||  || Son of Dúnlaing mac Tuathal ||unknown || 1024
|-
| Donnchad mac Dúnlainge 1024–1033 ||  || Son of Dúnlaing mac Tuathal ||unknown || unknown
|-
|}

Mac Giolla Phádraig (Dál Birn), 1033–1039

|-
| Donnchad mac Gilla Pátraic 1033–1039 ||  || Son of Gilla Pátraic mac Donnchada ||unknown || 1039
|-
|}

Uí Muiredaig (Uí Dúnlainge), 1039–1042

|-
| Murchad mac Dúnlainge 1039–1042 ||  || Son of Dúnlaing mac Tuathal ||unknown || 1042
|-
|}

Mac Murchada (Uí Cheinnselaig), 1042–1115

|-
| Diarmait mac Máel na mBó 1042–1072 ||  || Son of Donnchad Máel na mBó || Derbforgaill, daughter of Donnchad mac Briain || 7 February 1072
|-
| Murchad mac Diarmata 1052–1070 ||  || Son of Diarmait mac Máel na mBó ||unknown || 1070
|-
| Domnall mac Murchada 1072–1075 ||  || Son of Murchad mac Diarmata ||unknown || 1075
|-
| Donnchad mac Domnaill Remair 1075–1089 ||  || Son of Domnall Remar mac Máel na mBó ||unknown || 1089
|-
| Énna mac Diarmata 1089–1092 ||  || Son of Diarmait mac Máel na mBó ||unknown || 1092
|-
| Diarmait mac Énna 1092–1098 ||  || Son of Énna mac Diarmata ||unknown || 1098
|-
| Donnchadh mac Murchada 1098–1115 ||  || Son of Murchad mac Diarmata ||unknown || 1115
|-
|}

Ó Conchobhair Uí Failghe, 1115

|-
| Conchobar mac Congalaig1115 ||  || Son of Congalach Ua Conchobair||unknown || 1115
|-

|}

Mac Murchada (Uí Cheinnselaig), 1115–1171

|-
| Diarmait mac Énna meic Murchada 1115–1117 ||  || Son of Énna Mac Murchada ||unknown || 1117
|-
| Énna mac Donnchada mic Murchada 1117–1126 ||  || Son of Donnchadh mac Murchada ||unknown || 1126
|-
| Diarmait Mac Murchada 1126–11661169–1171 ||  || Son of Donnchad mac Murchada ||unknown || 1171
|-
|}

Caomhánach, 1171–1603 (Uí Cheinnselaig)

|-
| Domhnall Caomhánach Mac Murchada 1171–1175 ||  || Son of Diarmait Mac Murchada ||unknown || 1175
|-
| Domhnall Óg mac Domhnall Caomhánach – ||  || Son of Domhnall Caomhánach Mac Murchada ||unknown || unknown 
|-
| Muirchertach mac Domhnall Óg Mac Murchada Caomhánach –1282 ||  || Son of Domhnall Óg mac Domhnall Caomhánach ||unknown || 1282
|-
| Muiris mac Muirchertach Mac Murchada Caomhánach 1282–1314 ||  || Son of Muirchertach mac Domhnall Óg Mac Murchada Caomhánach ||unknown || 1314
|-
| Art Mac Murchada Caomhánach 1314–1323 ||  || Son of Domhnall Óg mac Domhnall Caomhánach ||unknown || 1361
|-
| Domhnall mac Art Mac Murchada Caomhánach 1323–1338 ||  || Son of Art mac Domhnall Óg Mac Murchada Caomhánach ||unknown || 1338
|-
| Domhnall mac Domhnall Mac Murchada Caomhánach 1338–1347 ||  || Son of Domhnall mac Art Mac Murchada Caomhánach ||unknown || 1338
|-
| Muirchertach mac Muiris Mac Murchada Caomhánach 1347–1354 ||  || Son of Muiris mac Muirchertach Mac Murchada Caomhánach ||unknown || 1354
|-
| Art Mór Mac Murchada Caomhánach 1354–1362 ||  || Son of Muirchertach mac Muiris Mac Murchada Caomhánach ||unknown || 1362
|-
| Diarmait Mac Murchada Caomhánach 1362–1369 ||  || Son of Domhnall mac Domhnall Mac Murchada Caomhánach ||unknown || 1369
|-
| Donnchadh mac Muirchertach Mac Murchada Caomhánach 1369–1375 ||  || Son of Muirchertach mac Muiris Mac Murchada Caomhánach ||unknown || 1375
|-
| Art Mór Mac Murchadha Caomhánach 1369–1375 ||  || Son of Muirchertach mac Muiris Mac Murchada Caomhánach ||unknown || 1375
|-
| Art Óg Mac Murchadha Caomhánach 1375–1417 ||  || Son of Art Mór Mac Murchadha Caomhánach ||unknown || 1417
|-
| Donnchadh mac Art Mac Murchadha Caomhánach 1417–1478 ||  || Son of Art Óg Mac Murchadha Caomhánach ||unknown || 1478
|-
| Domhnall Riabhach Mac Murchadha Caomhánach 1478 ||  || Son of Gerald Mac Murchadha Caomhánach ||unknown || 1478
|-
| Muircheartach mac Donnchadh Mac Murchadha Caomhánach 1478–1512 ||  || Son of Donnchadh mac Art Mac Murchadha Caomhánach ||unknown || 1512
|-
| Art Buidhe Mac Murchadha Caomhánach 1512–1517 ||  || Son of Domhnall Riabhach Mac Murchadha Caomhánach ||unknown || 1517
|-
| Gerald Mac Murchadha Caomhánach 1517–1523 ||  || Son of Domhnall Riabhach Mac Murchadha Caomhánach ||unknown || 1523
|-
| Muiris mac Domhnall Riabhach Mac Murchadha Caomhánach 1523–1531 ||  || Son of Domhnall Riabhach Mac Murchadha Caomhánach ||unknown || 1531
|-
| Muircheartach mac Art Buidhe Mac Murchadha Caomhánach 1531–1547 ||  || Son of Art Buidhe Mac Murchadha Caomhánach ||unknown || 1547
|-
| Muiris mac Domhnall Riabhach Mac Murchadha Caomhánach 1523–1531 ||  || Son of Domhnall Riabhach Mac Murchadha Caomhánach ||unknown || 1531
|-
| Murchadh Mac Murchadha Caomhánach 1531–1557 ||  || Son of Muiris mac Domhnall Riabhach Mac Murchadha Caomhánach ||unknown || 1531
|-
| Criomthann Mac Murchadha Caomhánach 1557–1582 ||  || Son of Murchadh Mac Murchadha Caomhánach ||unknown || 1582
|-
| Domhnall Spáinneach Mac Murchadha Caomhánach 1582–1603 ||  || Son of Donnchadh mac Cathaoir Mac Murchadha Caomhánach ||unknown || 1632
|-
|}

See also
 List of High Kings of Ireland
 List of Kings of Osraige
 List of kings of Ulster
 List of kings of Connacht
 List of kings of Munster
 List of kings of Mide

Sources
Book of Leinster, formerly Lebar na Núachongbála, section 26, page 181, Ríg Lagen; http://www.ucc.ie/celt/published/G800011A/text026.html
Kings of Leinster Genealogical Tables, pages 288–290,"Irish Kings and High Kings", Francis John Byrne, Dublin, 1973.   
Kings, Saints and Sagas, Alfred. P. Smyth, in Wicklow:History and Society, 1994. 
Kings, the kingship of Leinster and the regnal poems of "laidshencfhas Laigen:a reflection of dynastic politics in Leinster, 650–1150, Edel Bhreathnach, in ''Seanchas:Studies in Early and Medieval Irish Archaeology, History and Literature in Honour of Francis John Byrne, ed. Alfred P. Smyth, pp. 299–312, Four Courts Press, Dublin, 2000
Kings of Leinster Genealogical Tables, pages 247–249, "War, Politics and the Irish of Leinster 1156–1606", Emmett O'Bryne, Dublin, 2004. 
Register of Irish Chiefs as compiled by genealogist Sean J. Murphy: http://homepage.eircom.net/~seanjmurphy/chiefs/register.htm

External links
Annals of the Kings of Leinster
Uí Bairrche by Tracey Clann

 
Leinster
Lists of Irish monarchs
MacMorrough Kavanagh dynasty
Uí Ceinnselaig